Gianluca Arrighi (born 3 October 1972) is  an Italian writer and criminal lawyer.

Education and legal career
Arrighi earned his MSc in Law, joining the Italian Bar Association in 2002. He has been Teaching Assistant of Criminal Law with both Sapienza University of Rome and the University of Cassino, and author of scholarly papers and articles published in law journals. He made his debut as a writer with Crimina romana in 2009: Arrighi drew on his experience as criminal lawyer for this essay, a short story collection focusing on court cases he had handled, and which catalyzed him to start writing about actions of real offenders, focusing on their personal background and human traits. A limited edition of the book has been purchased by the Province of Rome under the Presidency of Nicola Zingaretti, and it was distributed as a reference reading for high school students as part of a project intended to promote a culture of lawfulness and to combat youth crime. Within this framework, Arrighi met about two hundred students, sitting for Q&A sessions about crimes and criminality.

Writing career
Arrighi released his first crime novel, Vincolo di sangue in 2012. Based on a filicide case committed by Rosalia Quartararo in Summer 1993, the book featured in the Ibs list of best-selling books for six months, ranking sixth.

In the same year, Italy’s top commercial broadcaster Mediaset has interviewed Gianluca Arrighi as one of the eight best Italian crime writers.

With L’inganno della memoria, published in March 2014, Arrighi brought to life the fictional character Elia Preziosi, a Rome-based enigmatic and aloof public prosecutor. L'inganno della memoria turned out to be the best-selling Italian legal thriller in 2014. Elia Preziosi featured again in two of Arrighi’s following thriller novels: namely, Il confine dell’ombra and A un passo dalla follia.

Oltre ogni verità is his first novel starring Jader Leoni.

Besides, since 2010 Arrighi has been writing several noir short stories.

One year after L'inganno della memoria was published, Arrighi was victim of stalking. His stalker - an aspiring writer who has been later identified by the police and sentenced in court in Rome - confessed to investigators that he had persecuted Arrighi because he was envious of his success.

Between 2020 and 2021, he published the novels Intrigo in Costa Verde and Sulle orme del brivido. On June 17, 2022 the thriller La casa sul fiume is released, for which the filmmaking rights have been sold.

References 

1972 births
Writers from Rome
21st-century Italian novelists
Living people